William V.S. Thorne was an American tennis player active in the late 19th century.

Thorne reached the All-Comers final of the U.S. National Championships in 1884, defeating future champion Henry Slocum and Clarence Clark. He lost to Howard Taylor, who was subsequently defeated in the Challenge Round by three-time defending champion Richard D. Sears.

Grand Slam finals

All-Comers singles (1 runner-up)

References

1865 births
1920 deaths
American male tennis players
Tennis people from New York (state)
Yale Bulldogs men's tennis players